Shirley Love (born January 6, 1940<ref>Hamilton, David and Andris-Michalaros, Aliki (eds.), "Love, Shirley", Metropolitan Opera Encyclopedia, Simon and Schuster, 1987, p. 198. </ref>) is an American operatic mezzo-soprano. Born in Detroit, Michigan, she studied singing in her home city with Avery Crew before pursuing further voice training with Marinka Gurevich and Margaret Harshaw in New York City. She made her professional opera début at the Metropolitan Opera on November 30, 1963, as the Second Lady in Wolfgang Amadeus Mozart's The Magic Flute with Anna Moffo as Pamina, Nicolai Gedda as Tamino, Gianna D'Angelo as The Queen of the Night, Cesare Siepi as Sarastro, Theodor Uppman as Papageno, and Silvio Varviso conducting.

Love remained at the Met for the next 20 consecutive seasons, notably portraying The Priestess in Aida, Annina in Der Rosenkavalier, Emilia in Otello,  Rossweisse  in The Ring Cycle, Gertrud in Hänsel und Gretel, Maddalena in Rigoletto, The Nurse and Innkeeper in Boris Godunov, Mother Jeanne in Dialogues des Carmélites, Berta in The Barber of Seville, Suzuki in Madama Butterfly, and Mercédès in Carmen. She also sang a large number of secondary roles at the house. Guest appearances took her to Europe (Germany and Italy) and to Philadelphia, Chicago, Cincinnati, Baltimore and Miami. Among her modern repertory were roles in Sergius Kagen’s Hamlet and Leonard Bernstein’s Trouble in Tahiti.

Love has received reviews for her recorded work in The New York Times, Opera News, and Ovation Magazine. Said recordings include The Diary of One Who Disappeared by Leoš Janáček and The Rake's Progress'' by Igor Stravinsky. A portrait of the singer can be found in the Metropolitan Opera gallery, New York City.

References

External links
 Official Website of Shirley Love

1940 births
Living people
American operatic mezzo-sopranos
Singers from Detroit
20th-century American women opera singers
Classical musicians from Michigan
21st-century American women